The Middle College Program is a high school alternative program first established in New York. It is a collaboration between a high school district and a community college for high school students who desire a more independent learning environment. Students take a combination of core high school courses and college courses to receive their diploma and graduate.

History of the Middle College Program
The first Middle College Program began as a charter high school at LaGuardia Community College. It opened in 1974 as an alternative high school under the joint auspices of the New York City Board of Education and LaGuardia Community College of the City University of New York. It was funded by grants from the Carnegie Corporation and the Fund for the Improvement for Post Secondary Education.

United States educational programs
Education in New York (state)